Flesh and Bone is the second album by American singer-songwriter Lucy Kaplansky, released in 1996. The original release of the CD contained a hidden "Track 0" containing a cover of the Beatles' "I've Just Seen a Face" that could be accessed on some players by stepping back a track from Track 1.

Track listing 
All songs by Lucy Kaplansky and Richard Litvin unless otherwise noted.
 "Scorpion" – 3:51
 "(What's So Funny 'Bout) Peace, Love, and Understanding" (Nick Lowe) – 3:19
 "If You Could See" – 3:32
 "Don't Renege on Our Love" (Richard Thompson) – 4:16
 "Still Life" – 5:58
 "This Is Mine" – 3:08
 "Mary and the Soldier" (Traditional) – 4:47
 "Love Is the Ride" – 2:45
 "The Thief" – 3:46
 "Edges" – 5:14
 "Return of the Grievous Angel" (Gram Parsons, Thomas Stanley Brown) – 3:52
 "Ruby" – 4:22

Personnel
Lucy Kaplansky – vocals, guitar, background vocals
Marc Shulman – guitar
Larry Campbell – guitar, fiddle, dobro, mandolin, pedal steel guitar, Cittern, guitar
Anton Sanko – organ, guitar, tiple, lap steel guitar
Gary Schreiner – accordion
Drew Zingg – guitar
Zev Katz – bass
Jennifer Kimball – background vocals
John Gorka – background vocals
Richard Shindell – background vocals
Frank Vilardi – drums, percussion
Production notes:
Anton Sanko – producer
Tom Mudge – engineer
Bruce Calder – engineer
Dennis McNerney – mixing, engineer
Matt Knobel – mixing, engineer
David Glasser – mastering
Linda Beauvais – art direction
Paul Brady – arranger

References 

1996 albums
Albums produced by Larry Campbell (musician)
Lucy Kaplansky albums
Red House Records albums